José Rojo Martín (born 23 March 1968), known as Pacheta, is a Spanish former footballer who played as a midfielder, currently manager of Real Valladolid.

He amassed La Liga totals of 183 matches and 15 goals over eight seasons, representing in the competition Real Burgos, Espanyol and Numancia. He added 112 games and 17 goals in the Segunda División.

In 2009, Pacheta became a manager.

Playing career
Born in Salas de los Infantes, Burgos, Castile and León, Pacheta made his debut as a senior with local Racing Lermeño in 1987 while also working as a carpenter. Two years later, he moved to CD Numancia of the Segunda División B.

After failing to appear in La Liga with Real Burgos CF during the 1990–91 season, Pacheta signed for third-tier side CA Marbella, being promoted in his debut campaign. On 6 September 1992, he played his first match as a professional, starting in a 1–1 home draw against CD Castellón in the Segunda División.

In June 1994, after a short spell at CP Mérida, Pacheta joined RCD Espanyol of the top division. His maiden appearance in the competition took place on 17 September, when he came on as a second-half substitute in the 0–0 home draw with FC Barcelona. He scored his first goal on 16 April of the following year, in a 3–1 victory over Athletic Bilbao also at the Sarrià Stadium.

Pacheta signed with Numancia of the same league in summer 1999, after 134 competitive appearances for the Catalans. He retired in 2004 at the age of 36, joining the former club's staff shortly after.

Coaching career
In June 2007, Pacheta was appointed Numancia's director of football, switching to manager on 17 February 2009 as a replacement for the fired Sergije Krešić. He remained in charge for the following 15 matches, as the Soria team were eventually relegated from the top flight.

On 15 February 2011, Pacheta signed for Real Oviedo in division three, leading the club to eighth place and renewing his contract for a further year in May. He resigned on 24 May 2012, and joined FC Cartagena on 10 December.

Pacheta was relieved of his duties on 20 May 2013, despite earning runner-up honours in the league with the Murcians, albeit without promotion to the second tier. He moved abroad in August, being appointed at Ekstraklasa side Korona Kielce.

Pacheta left the Polish team in June 2014, and signed with Hércules CF shortly after. On 25 January of the following year, he was sacked after only managing to win three out of twelve home games.

On 27 February 2018, after an experience in Thailand with Ratchaburi FC, Pacheta replaced the dismissed Josico at the helm of Elche CF. On 22 May 2019, after achieving promotion to the second division the previous campaign, he renewed his contract for a further season.

Just two days after promoting to the top tier in the play-offs, Pacheta left the Estadio Manuel Martínez Valero on 25 August 2020. The following 12 January, he took over for Míchel at SD Huesca in the same league. After not being able to avoid relegation, he resigned.

On 16 June 2021, Pacheta was appointed manager of Real Valladolid, also relegated to the second division.

Managerial statistics

References

External links

Espanyol archives 

1968 births
Living people
Sportspeople from the Province of Burgos
Spanish footballers
Footballers from Castile and León
Association football midfielders
La Liga players
Segunda División players
Segunda División B players
Tercera División players
Racing Lermeño players
CD Numancia players
Real Burgos CF footballers
CA Marbella footballers
CP Mérida footballers
RCD Espanyol footballers
Spanish football managers
La Liga managers
Segunda División managers
Segunda División B managers
CD Numancia managers
Real Oviedo managers
FC Cartagena managers
Hércules CF managers
Elche CF managers
SD Huesca managers
Real Valladolid managers
Korona Kielce managers
Ratchaburi Mitr Phol F.C. managers
Spanish expatriate football managers
Expatriate football managers in Poland
Expatriate football managers in Thailand
Spanish expatriate sportspeople in Poland
Spanish expatriate sportspeople in Thailand